Richard Moore Rive (1 March 1931 – 4 June 1989) was a South African writer and academic, who was from Cape Town.

Biography
Rive was born on 1 March 1931 in Caledon Street in the working-class Coloured residential area District Six of Cape Town.

His father was African, and his mother was Coloured. Rive was given the latter classification under apartheid. Rive went to St Mark's Primary School and Trafalgar High School, both in District Six. In 1951 he went to Hewat College of Education in Athlone, where he qualified as a teacher. He was a prominent sportsman (a South African hurdles champion while a student) and a school sports administrator.

He acquired a BA degree from the University of Cape Town in 1962. In 1963 he was given a scholarship organised by Es'kia Mphahlele, the editor of Drum magazine, in which Rive published some of his early writing. His first novel, Emergency was published in 1964. In 1965 Rive was awarded a Fulbright scholarship. He earned an MA degree (1966) from Columbia University in the United States, and a Ph.D. from Oxford University (1974). His doctoral thesis on Olive Schreiner would be published posthumously, in 1996.

Rive was for many years Head of the English Department at Hewat College. He was a visiting professor at several overseas universities, including Harvard University in 1987. He also delivered guest lectures at more than 50 universities on four continents.

A firm believer in anti-racism, Rive decided to stay in his country with the hope of influencing its development there.

He was stabbed to death at his home in Cape Town in 1989, when he was 58 years old.

Writing
Rive initially published his stories in South African magazines such as Drum and Fighting Talk. His collection African Songs was published in 1963 by Seven Seas Books. He edited anthologies for Heinemann's African Writers Series: the short story anthology Quartet (1963) - containing stories by Alex La Guma, James Matthews, Alf Wannenburgh and Rive himself - and the prose anthology Modern African Prose (1964). His short story "The Bench", for which he won a prize, is still anthologised. "The Bench" takes the well known story of Rosa Parks and sets it in South Africa. He also wrote three novels that were published in his lifetime. Emergency (1964) was set against the Sharpeville massacre. Buckingham Palace District Six was published in 1986 and turned into a musical by the Baxter Theatre in Cape Town. Rive also published an autobiography entitled Writing Black in 1981.

Rive's last novel, Emergency Continued, was completed two weeks before his death.

Honours
On 23 August 2013, at the Aziz Hassim Literary Awards held in Durban, Rive and two other esteemed South African authors, Ronnie Govender and Don Mattera, were honoured for their contributions to the fight against apartheid through literature. The authors all reflected on non-racial enclaves in South Africa during that era: Rive focused on District Six, Govender on Cato Manor, and Mattera on Sophiatown.

Bibliography

Novels
 Emergency (1964) 
 Buckingham Palace District Six (1986)
 Writing Black (1981)
 Emergency Continued (1991)

References

External links
 "Richard Rive", South African History Online
 Shaun Viljoen, "Richard Rive: A Skewed Biography", PhD thesis, University of the Witwatersrand, 2006

1989 deaths
1931 births
South African male short story writers
South African short story writers
South African male novelists
South African murder victims
People murdered in South Africa
South African LGBT novelists
20th-century South African novelists
20th-century short story writers
20th-century South African male writers
Alumni of Trafalgar High School (Cape Town)
20th-century South African LGBT people